Rashad Madden (born May 23, 1992) is an American professional basketball player for BC Brno of the Czech National Basketball League. He played college basketball for the University of Arkansas before playing professionally in Poland, Greece and Israel.

High school career
Madden played high school basketball at East Poinsett County High School, in Lepanto, Arkansas.

College career
Madden played college basketball at the University of Arkansas, with the Arkansas Razorbacks from 2011 to 2015.

Professional career
Madden earned an invite to the 2015 NBA Summer League, where he played for the Memphis Grizzlies. He signed with Śląsk Wrocław of Poland's Basketball League. Madden averaged 9.7 points and 3.8 assists per game in his first year on the team in the Polish League. He left the club on December due to finance problems. He then signed in Greece, to play with the Greek Basket League club Rethymno Cretan Kings, replacing Marcus Relphorde.
He signed for Hapoel Ramat Gan Givatayim of the Israeli National League in August 2016.

On October 11, 2018, Madden signed with Hapoel Galil Elyon for the 2018–19 season. In 37 games played for Galil Elyon, he averaged 15.6 points, 6.9 rebounds and 3.7 assists per game, while shooting 39.6 percent from three-point range. Madden led Galil Elyon to the Israeli National League Finals, where they eventually were fell short to Maccabi Haifa.

On December 4, 2019, Madden signed a one-month contract with Elitzur Yavne as an injury cover for Daniel Mullings. On January 19, 2020, Madden signed with Elitzur Netanya for the rest of the season. He averaged 18.4 points, 6.2 rebounds, 7.5 assists, and 1.0 steal per game. On September 2, 2021, Madden signed with BC Brno of the Czech National Basketball League.

The Basketball Tournament
Rashad Madden played for Team Arkansas in the 2018 edition of The Basketball Tournament. In 2 games, he averaged 5.5 points, 5.5 rebounds, and 3 assists per game. Team Arkansas reached the second round before falling to the Talladega Knights.

References

External links 
FIBAEurope Cup Profile
Draftexpress.com Profile
Eurobasket.com Profile

1992 births
Living people
American expatriate basketball people in Greece
American expatriate basketball people in Israel
American expatriate basketball people in Poland
American men's basketball players
Arkansas Razorbacks men's basketball players
Basketball players from Arkansas
Elitzur Maccabi Netanya B.C. players
Elitzur Yavne B.C. players
Hapoel Galil Elyon players
Hapoel Ramat Gan Givatayim B.C. players
People from Lepanto, Arkansas
Point guards
Rethymno B.C. players
Shooting guards
Śląsk Wrocław basketball players